Lagoinha is a municipality in the eastern part of the state of São Paulo, Brazil. It is part of the Metropolitan Region of Vale do Paraíba e Litoral Norte. The population is 4,889 (2020 est.) in an area of 255.47 km². The elevation is 913 m.

Economic activity centres upon agriculture, mainly dairy cattle and reforestry. Tourism has been growing in the region due to the abundance of water sources, falls, and natural hills, valley and forest environments.

Population history

Demographics

According to the 2000 IBGE Census, the population was 4,957, of which 2,877 or 58.04% are urban and 2,080 or (41.96%) are rural.  The life expectancy for the city was 71.69 years.  The fertility rate was at 2.31.  The municipality has 2,585 males and 2,372 females.  For every 100 males, there are 91.7 females.  The literacy rate was 85.64%

References

External links
  http://www.lagoinha.sp.gov.br
  citybrazil.com.br

Municipalities in São Paulo (state)